Estácio may refer to:
Estácio de Sá, a Portuguese soldier who was a founder of Rio de Janeiro, Brazil
Estácio Coimbra, a Brazilian politician
Estácio, Rio de Janeiro, a neighborhood in Rio de Janeiro, Brazil
Estácio Station, a subway station in Rio de Janeiro, Brazil
Estácio S.A., an education company in Brazil